Nelson Simmons Lawson (1 May 1806 – 3 February 1849) was an Australian politician.

He was born at sea on the Lady Nelson, the son of William Lawson and Sarah Leadbeater.  His first wife was Honoria Mary Dickinson whom he married on 7 January 1836 with whom he had six children. His second wife was Sarah Anne Kirke.

In August 1848 he was elected one of two members for the County of Cumberland in the New South Wales Legislative Council, succeeding his father.

Lawson died near Prospect in 1849, aged 42.

See also
Members of the New South Wales Legislative Council, 1843–1851
Results of the 1848 New South Wales colonial election

References

 

1806 births
1849 deaths
Members of the New South Wales Legislative Council
19th-century Australian politicians
People born at sea